Héctor Javier Velazco (20 May 1973,Avellaneda) is an Argentine boxer.

Professional career 

Known as "El Artillero", Velazco turned pro in 1996 and compiled a record of 28-1-1 in his first 31 fights before he defeated András Gálfi on 3 March 2003 for the vacant WBO interim middleweight title. He was elevated to full champion when original titleholder Harry Simon failed to make his mandatory defense due to injuries suffered in a car accident. He would go on to lose the belt in his first defense to Felix Sturm in what would be his first fight outside of his native Argentina. Velazco had a record of 8–6 in his final 14 fights before deciding to retire from the sport in 2010.

Professional boxing record

See also 
List of middleweight boxing champions

External links 

1973 births
Living people
Middleweight boxers
Super-middleweight boxers
World middleweight boxing champions
World Boxing Organization champions
Sportspeople from Avellaneda
Argentine male boxers